Ipswich Heaths is a  biological Site of Special Scientific Interest in Ipswich in Suffolk.

The site consists of two separate areas in Martlesham Heath and Purdis Heath. They contain heather heath and acid grassland, with clumps of bracken and gorse. This mosaic of habitats is valuable for butterflies. such as the silver-studded blue, common blue and small heath.

Footpaths cross the heaths.

References

Sites of Special Scientific Interest in Suffolk